The Protectorate-General to Pacify the East was an administrative division of the Chinese Tang dynasty in Manchuria and the northern part of the Korean Peninsula. It was established after the Tang dynasty defeated Goguryeo and annexed its territories. In the place of Baekje and Goguryeo, the Tang dynasty created the Protectorate General to Pacify the East and the Ungjin Commandery. A proposal to set up the Great Commandery of Gyerim by the Emperor Gaozong of Tang to King Munmu of Silla was refused.

History 

After the Tang dynasty conquered Goguryeo in 668, the Protectorate General to Pacify the East, otherwise known as the Andong Protectorate, was created in Pyongyang and supposedly stationed with 200,000 soldiers. The protectorate was divided into 9 commanderies, 42 prefectures, and 100 counties.

In 669 the people of Goguryeo revolted in response to Tang governance. In response the Tang forcibly deported 78,000 households and resettled them in empty areas south of the Changjiang (Yangtze) and Huai River, each in contemporary China. The weak and poor were left behind and assigned to guard duty in service of the protectorate.

From 670 to 673 the rebels launched an uprising every year, the last of which lasted for four years. The Goguryeo loyalists were aided by the kingdom of Silla, who were angered by Emperor Gaozong of Tang. Originally Emperor Taizong of Tang promised to exchange Baekje and the lands south of Pyongyang in return for Silla's military cooperation. However Taizong died before the conquest of Goguryeo was completed, and his successor Gaozong reneged on the promise.

In 671, Sillan forces drove out the Tang. In 675 the Tang attacked Silla and defeated them in Gyeonggi. In response Munmu of Silla dispatched a tributary mission to Tang with apologies. Gaozong accepted Munmu's apologies and withdrew Tang troops to deal with the Tibetan threat in the west. Seeing the Tang's strategic weakness, Silla renewed the advance on Tang territory. In 676 Silla launched a surprise attack on Tang forces south of Taedong River in the brief intermittent Silla–Tang War, during which Silla destroyed the Ungjin commandery and drove Tang forces north of the Taedong over the course of several battles.

By 676 the Tang were forced to relocate the protectorate seat to the more easily defendable city of Liaoyang.

In 677 the seat was moved to Xincheng, in modern Fushun, Liaoning.

In 667 the deposed Bojang of Goguryeo was designated "Liaodong Commander King of Joseon". Upon arriving in Liaodong, he plotted with the Mohe people to revive Goguryeo. News of his intentions reached the Tang, and Bojang was banished to southwestern China in 681.

In 714, the seat was moved to Pingzhou, in modern Lulong County, Qinhuangdao, Hebei.

In 736, the Tang formally recognized Silla's control of Korea south of the Taedong River. In 743, the seat was moved to the Old City of Liaoxi, possibly Ying Prefecture (modern Chaoyang, Liaoning).

The Protectorate General to Pacify the East, otherwise known as the Andong Protectorate, was abandoned in 756 or ended in 761.

List of protector generals 

 Wei Zhe (668–669) 
 Xue Rengui (669–670) – 안동도호부사/安東都護府使
 Gao Kan (670–676)
 Bojang of Goguryeo (677–681) – (Hangul : 요동주도독 조선왕 Hanja:遼東州都督朝鮮王) and (Hangul : 조선군왕 Hanja:朝鮮郡王)
 Qu Tuquan (681–685)
 Xue Ne (685–696) 薛訥 – 安東道經略 안동도경락 – also military commander of Youjou
 Pei Xuangui (696–698) 裴玄珪
 Go Deokmu (698–699) (Hangul : 고덕무 Hanja: 高德武), Son of Bojang – 안동도독/安東都督
 Tang Xiujing (704–705) 唐休璟
 Pei Huaigu (712) 裴懷古
 Sun Jian (712) 孫儉
 Shan Sijing (713) 單思敬
 Xu Qincou (714) 許欽湊
 Xu Qindan (714) 許欽澹
 Zhang Shuo (715–719) 張說
 Xue Tai (720–725) 薛泰
 Li Jiao (727–732) 李璬
 Pei Min (733–741) 裴旻
 Jia Xun (742–755) 賈循
 Wang Xuanzhi (756–758) 王玄志
 Hou Xiyi (758–761) 侯希逸

Administrative area 
Administratively, it was intended to oversee nine commanderies, 42 prefectures (later reorganized into 14) and 100 counties.

Nine commanderies 
Sinseongju (Hangul: 신성주 Hanja/Hanzi: 新城州)
Yoseongju (Hangul: 요성주Hanja/Hanzi: 遼城州/辽城州)
Gamulju (Hangul: 가물주 Hanja/Hanzi: 哥勿州) 
Wirakju (Hangul: 위락주Hanja/Hanzi: 衛樂州/卫乐州)
Saraju (Hangul: 사리주 Hanja/Hanzi: 舍利州)  
Geosoju (Hangul: 거소주 Hanja/Hanzi: 去素州/居素州)         
Wueolhuiji (Hangul: 월희주 Hanja/Hanzi: 越喜州)
Geodanju (Hangul: 거단주 Hanja/Hanzi: 去旦州) 
Geonanju (Hangul: 건안주 Hanja/Hanzi: 建安州)

14 prefectures (州) 
Namso (Hangul: 남소주 Hanja/Hanzi: 南蘇州)
Gaemo (Hangul: 개모주 Hanja/Hanzi: 蓋牟州)
Daena (Hangul: 대나주 Hanja/Hanzi: 大那州)
Changam (Hangul: 창암주 Hanja/Hanzi: 倉巖州)
Mami (Hangul: 마미주 Hanja/Hanzi: 磨米州)
Jeokri (Hangul: 적리주 Hanja/Hanzi: 積利州)
Yeosan (Hangul: 여산주 Hanja/Hanzi: 黎山州)
Yeonjin (Hangul: 연진주 Hanja/Hanzi: 延津州)
Mokjeo (Hangul: 목저주 Hanja/Hanzi: 木底州)
Ansi (Hangul: 안시주 Hanja/Hanzi: 安市州)
Chebok (Hangul: 제북주 Hanja/Hanzi: 諸北州)
Shikri (Hangul: 식리주 Hanja/Hanzi: 識利州)
Buryeol (Hangul: 불열주 Hanja/Hanzi: 拂涅州)
Baehan (Hangul: 배한주 Hanja/Hanzi: 拜漢州)

See also
Administrative divisions of the Tang dynasty
Protectorate General to Pacify the West
Protectorate General to Pacify the South 
Four Commanderies of Han
Ungjin Commandery
Gyerim Territory Area Command
Chinese military history
Honglujing Stele
Three Kingdoms of Korea

References

Bibliography
Lee, K.-b.  (1984).  A new history of Korea. Tr. by E.W. Wagner & E.J. Schulz, based on the Korean rev. ed. of 1979.  Seoul: Ilchogak.  

756 disestablishments
Military history of the Tang dynasty
Administrative divisions of the Tang dynasty
Former commanderies of China in Korea
Goguryeo
States and territories established in the 660s
668 establishments
7th century in China
8th century in China